The 1993 Japanese Touring Car Championship season was the 9th edition of the series and the last to be run under Group A regulations. It began at Mine Central Circuit on 14 March and finished after nine events at Fuji Speedway on 31 October. The championship was won by Masahiko Kageyama, driving for Team Impul.

Teams & Drivers

Calendar
Overall winner in bold.

Championship Standings
Points were awarded 20, 15, 12, 10, 8, 6, 4, 3, 2, 1 to the top 10 finishers in each class, with no bonus points for pole positions or fastest laps. All scores counted towards the championship. In cases where teammates tied on points, the driver who completed the greater distance during the season was given the higher classification.

References

Touring Car Championship
Japanese Touring Car Championship seasons